Thomas A. Delnicki commonly known as Tom Delnicki (born September 7, 1956) is an American politician who has served in the Connecticut House of Representatives from the 14th district since 2017. Delnicki is a Republican.

Early life and education 
Delnicki was born September 7, 1956 in South Windsor, Connecticut. He grew-up on the family farm which was owned in the fourth generation. He graduated from South Windsor High School in 1974 and earned a Bachelor's degree from the University of Connecticut. He is of Lithuanian descent (original spelling was Delnickas) on his fathers side.

Career 
He retired from the Metropolitian District as a Facilities/Maintenance Supervisor.

Politics 
Delnicki served on the South Windsor Town Council from 1995 to 2007 and again from 2009. During his tenure on the council, he has been Mayor twice, Deputy Mayor and served on the first Strategic Planning Committee formed in 1999. Since January 4, 2017 he serves as a member of the Connecticut House of Representatives for the Republican Party.

Personal life 
In 1986, Delnicki married Audrey J. Bryda (b. c. 1960), in South Windsor, Connecticut.

References

1956 births
Living people
Republican Party members of the Connecticut House of Representatives
21st-century American politicians